Abirim (lit. Knights), also known as Mitzpe Abirim,  is a community settlement in northern Israel. Located in the Upper Galilee, three kilometres from Ma'alot-Tarshiha, it falls under the jurisdiction of Ma'ale Yosef Regional Council. It is located in the middle of a natural oak forest bordering the Nahal Kziv nature reserve.

History
Abirim was established in 1980 and was initially named "Eder" and then renamed to "Abirim" after the nearby ruins of Burj Misr (Arabic: "Egyptian Tower"), which was renamed to Horbat Metsad Abirim (Hebrew: "Ruin of the Fortress of the Knights") in 1957. The age and original purpose of the ruins is unknown; proposals range from a Crusader stronghold to a mausoleum from the Hellenistic period (4th–3rd centuries BCE). Abirim is located on land that had belonged to the Palestinian villages of Dayr al-Qassi and al-Mansura, both of which were depopulated in the 1948 Arab–Israeli War.

See also
Israeli wine

References

External links
Official website

Community settlements
Populated places established in 1980
Populated places in Northern District (Israel)
1980 establishments in Israel